Alcides, ou Le triomphe d'Hercule (Alcides, or The Triumph of Hercules) is an opera by the French composers Louis Lully and Marin Marais, first performed on at the Académie Royale de Musique (the Paris Opera) on 3 February 1693. It takes the form of a tragédie en musique in five acts and a prologue. The libretto is by Jean Galbert de Campistron.

Sources
  Libretto at "Livres baroques"
 Félix Clément and Pierre Larousse Dictionnaire des Opéras, Paris, 1881, page 18.

French-language operas
Tragédies en musique
Operas by Marin Marais
1693 operas
Operas
Opera world premieres at the Paris Opera